Reagan is a given name. Notable people with the name include:

Reagan Dunn (born 1971), American politician
Reagan Gomez-Preston (born 1980), American actress
Reagan Maui'a (born 1984), American football player
Reagan Dale Neis (born 1976), Canadian actress
Reagan Louie  (born 1951), American photographer
Reagan Pasternak (born 1977), Canadian actress
Reagan Tokes (1995–2017), American female murder victim
Reagan Wilson (born 1947), American model
Reagan Wickens (born 1994), Australian swimmer

Fictional characters
Reagan Lucas, a character in the television sitcom New Girl
Reagan Ridley, a main character in the animated series Inside Job

See also
Rheagan Wallace (born 1987), American actress
Reagan (surname)
Regan